Susan Howson may refer to:

Susan Howson (economist) (born 1945), British economist
Susan Howson (mathematician) (born 1973), British mathematician